Hair conditioner is a hair care cosmetic product used to improve the feel, texture, appearance, and manageability of hair. Its main purpose is to reduce friction between strands of hair to allow smoother brushing or combing, which might otherwise cause damage to the scalp. Various other benefits are often advertised, such as hair repair, strengthening, or a reduction in split ends.

Conditioners are available in a wide range of forms including viscous liquids, gels, and creams, as well as thinner lotions and sprays. Hair conditioner is usually used after the hair has been washed with shampoo. It is applied and worked into the hair, and may either be rinsed out a short time later or left in.

History
For centuries, natural oils have been used to condition human hair. A conditioner popular with men in the late Victorian era was Macassar oil, but this product was quite greasy and necessitated the pinning of a small cloth, known as an antimacassar, to the headrests of chairs and sofas to preserve the upholstery from being damaged by the oil.  

Modern hair conditioner was created at the turn of the 20th century when the Edouard Pinaud company presented a product he called Brilliantine at the 1900 Exposition Universelle in Paris. His product was intended to soften men's hair, including beards and moustaches. Since the invention of Pinaud's early products, modern science has advanced the hair conditioner industry to include those made with silicone, fatty alcohols, and quaternary ammonium compounds. These chemical products have the benefits of hair conditioner without feeling greasy or heavy.

Mechanism of action
The outermost layer of a hair follicle is called the cuticle and is composed largely of keratin. This is rich in cysteine groups which are mildly acidic. When the hair is washed these groups can deprotonate, giving the hair a negative charge.

The ingredients in conditioner, especially positively charged quaternary ammonium species, such as behentrimonium chloride or polymers that are known as Polyquaternium-XX, where XX is an arbitrary number, can then become attached to the hair via electrostatic interactions. Once attached these compounds have several effects. Their long hydrocarbon backbone helps to lubricate the surface of each hair follicle, reducing the sensation of roughness and assisting combing. The surface coating of cationic groups means that hairs are repelled from each other electrostatically, which reduces clumping. The compounds can also act as antistatic agents, which helps to reduce frizzing.

Types

 Conditioners, also called deep conditioners or hair masks, are heavy and thick, with a high content of cationic surfactants that are able to bind to the hair structure and "glue" the hair surface scales together. This type of conditioner is designed to restore hair's moisture levels and reduce breakage. These are usually applied to the hair for a longer time (30-45 minutes).
 Leave-in conditioners are thinner and have different surfactants, which add only a little material to the hair to avoid weighing down the hair or causing greasiness. They are based on unsaturated fatty acid chains, which are bent, not straight. Leave-in conditioner is designed to be used in a similar way to hair oil, preventing the tangling of hair and keeping it smooth. Its use is particularly prevalent by those with naturally curly or kinky hair.
 Rinse out/Rinse through conditioners are the most common or generic on the market. Ordinary conditioners are generally applied directly after using shampoo, and manufacturers usually produce a conditioner counterpart for different types of shampoo for this purpose.
 Hold conditioners, based on cationic polyelectrolyte polymers, hold the hair in a desired shape. These have a function and composition similar to diluted hair gels.
 Cleansing conditioners are a newer category, typically based on a combination of amphoteric and cationic surfactants that can be used in place of a shampoo either as a pre-treatment before shampooing for hair that is damaged or very curly.

Ingredients

There are several types of hair conditioner ingredients, differing in composition and functionality:
 Acidifiers, acidity regulators which maintain the conditioner's pH at about 3.5. In contact with acidic environment, the hair's somewhat scaly surface tightens up, as the hydrogen bonds between the keratin molecules are strengthened.
 Antistatic agents which bind to the hair and reduce the static, these can include cationic polymers such as Polyquaternium-10 and Guar Hydroxypropyltrimonium Chloride
 Detanglers, which modify the hair surface pH as acidifiers, or by coating it with polymers, as glossers.
 Glossers, light-reflecting chemicals which bind to the hair surface. Usually polymers, usually silicones, e.g., Dimethicone or Cyclopentasiloxane.
 Lubricants, such as fatty alcohols, Panthenol, Dimethicone, etc.
 Moisturizers, whose role is to hold moisture in the hair. Usually, these contain high proportions of humectants. These could also be provided by natural oils such as Prunus Amygdalus Dulcis (Sweet Almond) Oil.
 Oils (EFAs – essential fatty acids), which can help dry/porous hair become more soft and pliable. The scalp produces a natural oil called sebum. EFAs are the closest thing to natural sebum (sebum contains EFAs).
 Preservatives that protect the product from spoilage by microorganisms during the product shelf life.
 Reconstructors, usually containing hydrolyzed protein. Their role is supposedly to penetrate the hair and strengthen its structure through polymer crosslinking.
 Sequestrants, for better function in hard water.
 Sunscreen, for protection against protein degradation and color loss. Currently Benzophenone-4 and Ethylhexyl Methoxycinnamate are the two sunscreens most commonly used in hair products. Cinnamidopyltrimonium Chloride and a few others are used to a much lesser degree. The common sunscreens used on skin are rarely used for hair products due to their texture and weight effects.
 Surfactants – approximately 97% of hair consists of a protein called keratin. The surface of keratin contains negatively charged amino acids. Hair conditioners therefore usually contain cationic surfactants, which don't wash out completely, because their hydrophilic ends strongly bind to keratin. The hydrophobic ends of the surfactant molecules then act as the new hair surface. Examples are Behentrimonium Chloride and Cetrimonium Chloride
 Thermal protectors, usually heat-absorbing polymers, shielding the hair against excessive heat, caused by, e.g., blow-drying, curling irons or hot rollers.

pH
Conditioners are frequently acidic, as low pH protonates the keratin's amino acids. The hydrogen ions give the hair a positive charge and create more hydrogen bonds among the keratin scales, giving the hair a more compact structure. Organic acids such as citric acid are usually used to maintain acidity.

See also
 Anointing
 Brilliantine
 Brylcreem
 Pomade
 Shampoo

References

External links

 How Hair Conditioner Works at h2g2
 How to Apply Hair Conditioner at wikiHow

Hair care products